Richard Thompson Abrell (May 18, 1892 – May 5, 1973) was an American football player who played one season for the Dayton Triangles of the American Professional Football Association. He played college football at Purdue University.

References

1892 births
1973 deaths
American football quarterbacks
American football running backs
Purdue Boilermakers football players
Dayton Triangles players
Players of American football from Indiana
People from Linton, Indiana